The following are the list of Indonesian diplomats that served as Ambassador of the Republic of Indonesia to the Republic of Austria.
<onlyinclude>

See also 

 List of Indonesian ambassadors
 List of diplomatic missions of Indonesia
 Embassy of Austria, Jakarta
 Foreign relations of Austria
 Indonesia–Austria relations

Reference 

Ambassadors of Indonesia
Ambassadors of Indonesia to Austria